Love for Love is the fourteenth studio album by the American R&B/Soul vocal group The Whispers, released in 1983 by SOLAR Records.

Track listing

Charts

Weekly charts

Year-end charts

References

1983 albums
The Whispers albums
SOLAR Records albums
Albums produced by Leon Sylvers III